Trench warfare is the  type of land warfare using occupied lines largely comprising military trenches, in which troops are well-protected from the enemy's small arms fire and are substantially sheltered from artillery. Trench warfare became archetypically associated with World War I (1914–1918), when the Race to the Sea rapidly expanded trench use on the Western Front starting in September 1914.

Trench warfare proliferated when a revolution in firepower was not matched by similar advances in mobility, resulting in a grueling form of warfare in which the defender held the advantage. On the Western Front in 1914–1918, both sides constructed elaborate trench, underground, and dugout systems opposing each other along a front, protected from assault by barbed wire. The area between opposing trench lines (known as "no man's land") was fully exposed to artillery fire from both sides. Attacks, even if successful, often sustained severe casualties.

The development of armoured warfare and combined arms tactics permitted static lines to be bypassed and defeated, leading to the decline of trench warfare after the war. Following World War I, "trench warfare" became a byword for stalemate, attrition, sieges, and futility in conflict.

Precursors 

Field works have existed for as long as there have been armies. Roman legions, when in the presence of an enemy, entrenched camps nightly when on the move.

Trench warfare was also documented during the defense of Medina in a siege known as the Battle of the Trench (627 AD). The architect of the plan was Salman the Persian who suggested digging a trench to defend Medina.

There are examples of trench digging as a defensive measure during the Middle Ages in Europe, such as during the Piedmontese Civil War, where it was documented that on the morning of May 12, 1640, the French soldiers, having already captured the left bank of the Po river and gaining control of the bridge connecting the two banks of the river, and wanting to advance to the Capuchin Monastery of the Monte, deciding that their position wasn't secure enough for their liking, then choose to advance on a double attack on the trenches, but were twice repelled. Eventually, on the third attempt, the French broke through and the defenders were forced to flee with the civilian population, seeking the sanctuary of the local Catholic church, the Santa Maria al Monte dei Cappuccini, in Turin, also known at that time as the Capuchin Monastery of the Monte. An interesting read is about the Eucharistic Miracle of Turin, Italy, on May 12, 1640.

In early modern warfare troops used field works to block possible lines of advance. Examples include the Lines of Stollhofen, built at the start of the War of the Spanish Succession of 1702–1714, the Lines of Weissenburg built under the orders of the Duke of Villars in 1706, the Lines of Ne Plus Ultra during the winter of 1710–1711, and the Lines of Torres Vedras in 1809 and 1810.

In the New Zealand Wars (1845–1872), the Maori developed elaborate trench and bunker systems as part of fortified areas known as pa, employing them successfully as early as the 1840s to withstand British artillery bombardments. According to one British observer, "the fence round the pa is covered between every paling with loose bunches of flax, against which the bullets fall and drop; in the night they repair every hole made by the guns". These systems included firing trenches, communication trenches, tunnels, and anti-artillery bunkers. British casualty rates of up to 45 percent, such as at Gate Pa in 1864 and the Battle of Ohaeawai in 1845, suggested that contemporary weaponry, such as muskets and cannon, proved insufficient to dislodge defenders from a trench system. There has been an academic debate surrounding this since the 1980s, when in his book The New Zealand Wars, historian James Belich claimed that Northern Māori had effectively invented trench warfare during the first stages of the New Zealand Wars. However, this has been criticised by some other academics, with Gavin McLean noting that while the Māori had certainly adapted pa to suit contemporary weaponry, many historians have dismissed Belich's claim as "baseless... revisionism".

The Crimean War (1853–1856) saw "massive trench works and trench warfare", even though "the modernity of the trench war was not immediately apparent to the contemporaries".

Union and Confederate armies employed field works and extensive trench systems in the American Civil War (1861–1865) — most notably in the sieges of Vicksburg (1863) and Petersburg (1864–1865), the latter of which saw the first use by the Union Army of the rapid-fire Gatling gun, the important precursor to modern-day machine guns. Trenches were also utilized in the Paraguayan War (which started in 1864), the Second Anglo-Boer War (1899–1902), and the Russo-Japanese War (1904–1905).

Adoption 

Although technology had dramatically changed the nature of warfare by 1914, the armies of the major combatants had not fully absorbed the implications. Fundamentally, as the range and rate of fire of rifled small-arms increased, a defender shielded from enemy fire (in a trench, at a house window, behind a large rock, or behind other cover) was often able to kill several approaching foes before they closed around the defender’s position. Attacks across open ground became even more dangerous after the introduction of rapid-firing artillery, exemplified by the "French 75", and high explosive fragmentation rounds. The increases in firepower had outstripped the ability of infantry (or even cavalry) to cover the ground between firing lines, and the ability of armour to withstand fire. It would take a revolution in mobility to change that.

The French and German armies adopted different tactical doctrines: the French relied on the attack with speed and surprise, and the Germans relied on firepower, investing heavily in howitzers and machine guns. The British lacked an official tactical doctrine, with an officer corps that rejected theory in favour of pragmatism.

While the armies expected to use entrenchments and cover, they did not allow for the effect of defences in depth. They required a deliberate approach to seizing positions from which fire support could be given for the next phase of the attack, rather than a rapid move to break the enemy's line. It was assumed that artillery could still destroy entrenched troops, or at least suppress them sufficiently for friendly infantry and cavalry to manoeuvre.

Digging-in when defending a position was a standard practice by the start of WWI. To attack frontally was to court crippling losses, so an outflanking operation was the preferred method of attack against an entrenched enemy. After the Battle of the Aisne in September 1914, an extended series of attempted flanking moves, and matching extensions to the fortified defensive lines, developed into the "race to the sea", by the end of which German and Allied armies had produced a matched pair of trench lines from the Swiss border in the south to the North Sea coast of Belgium.

By the end of October 1914, the whole front in Belgium and France had solidified into lines of trenches, which lasted until the last weeks of the war. Mass infantry assaults were futile in the face of artillery fire, as well as rapid rifle and machine-gun fire. Both sides concentrated on breaking up enemy attacks and on protecting their own troops by digging deep into the ground. After the buildup of forces in 1915, the Western Front became a stalemated struggle between equals, to be decided by attrition. Frontal assaults, and their associated casualties, became inevitable because the continuous trench lines had no open flanks. Casualties of the defenders matched those of the attackers, as vast reserves were expended in costly counter-attacks or exposed to the attacker's massed artillery. There were periods in which rigid trench warfare broke down, such as during the Battle of the Somme, but the lines never moved very far. The war would be won by the side that was able to commit the last reserves to the Western Front. Trench warfare prevailed on the Western Front until the Germans launched their Spring Offensive on 21 March 1918. Trench warfare also took place on other fronts, including in Italy and at Gallipoli.

Armies were also limited by logistics. The heavy use of artillery meant that ammunition expenditure was far higher in WWI than in any previous conflict. Horses and carts were insufficient for transporting large quantities over long distances, so armies had trouble moving far from railheads. This greatly slowed advances, making it impossible for either side to achieve a breakthrough that would change the war. This situation would only be altered in WWII with greater use of motorized vehicles.

Construction 

Early World War I trenches were simple. They lacked traverses, and according to pre-war doctrine were to be packed with men fighting shoulder to shoulder. This doctrine led to heavy casualties from artillery fire. This vulnerability, and the length of the front to be defended, soon led to frontline trenches being held by fewer men. The defenders augmented the trenches themselves with barbed wire strung in front to impede movement; wiring parties went out every night to repair and improve these forward defences.

The small, improvised trenches of the first few months grew deeper and more complex, gradually becoming vast areas of interlocking defensive works. They resisted both artillery bombardment and mass infantry assault. Shell-proof dugouts became a high priority.

There were three standard ways to dig a trench: entrenching, sapping, and tunnelling. Entrenching, where a man would stand on the surface and dig downwards, was most efficient, as it allowed a large digging party to dig the full length of the trench simultaneously. However, entrenching left the diggers exposed above ground and hence could only be carried out when free of observation, such as in a rear area or at night. Sapping involved extending the trench by digging away at the end face. The diggers were not exposed, but only one or two men could work on the trench at a time. Tunnelling was like sapping except that a "roof" of soil was left in place while the trench line was established and then removed when the trench was ready to be occupied. The guidelines for British trench construction stated that it would take 450 men 6 hours at night to complete  of front-line trench system. Thereafter, the trench would require constant maintenance to prevent deterioration caused by weather or shelling.

Trenchmen were a specialized unit of trench excavators and repairmen. They usually dug or repaired in groups of four with an escort of two armed soldiers. Trenchmen were armed with one 1911 semi-automatic pistol, and were only utilized when either a new trench needed to be dug or expanded quickly, or when a trench was destroyed by artillery fire. Trenchmen were trained to dig with incredible speed; in a dig of three to six hours they could accomplish what would take a normal group of frontline infantry soldiers around two days. Trenchmen were usually looked down upon by fellow soldiers because they did not fight. They were usually called cowards because if they were attacked while digging, they would abandon the post and flee to safety. They were instructed to do this though because through the war there were only around 1,100 trained trenchmen. They were highly valued only by officers higher on the chain of command.

Components 

The banked earth on the lip of the trench facing the enemy was called the parapet and had a fire step. The embanked rear lip of the trench was called the parados, which protected the soldier's back from shells falling behind the trench. The sides of the trench were often revetted with sandbags, wire mesh, wooden frames and sometimes roofs. The floor of the trench was usually covered by wooden duckboards. In later designs the floor might be raised on a wooden frame to provide a drainage channel underneath. Due to the substantial casualties taken from indirect fire, some trenches were reinforced with corrugated metal roofs over the top as an improvised defense from shrapnel.

The static movement of trench warfare and a need for protection from snipers created a requirement for loopholes both for discharging firearms and for observation. Often a steel plate was used with a "key hole", which had a rotating piece to cover the loophole when not in use. German snipers used armour-piercing bullets that allowed them to penetrate loopholes. Another means to see over the parapet was the trench periscope – in its simplest form, just a stick with two angled pieces of mirror at the top and bottom. A number of armies made use of the periscope rifle, which enabled soldiers to snipe at the enemy without exposing themselves over the parapet, although at the cost of reduced shooting accuracy. The device is most associated with Australian and New Zealand troops at Gallipoli, where the Turks held the high ground.

Dugouts of varying degrees of comfort were built in the rear of the support trench. The Germans, who had based their knowledge on studies of the Russo-Japanese War, made something of a science out of designing and constructing defensive works. They used reinforced concrete to construct deep, shell-proof, ventilated dugouts, as well as strategic strongpoints.

Layout 

Trenches were never straight but were dug in a zigzagging or stepped pattern, with all straight sections generally kept less than a dozen meters. Later, this evolved to have the combat trenches broken into distinct fire bays connected by traverses. While this isolated the view of friendly soldiers along their own trench, this ensured the entire trench could not be enfiladed if the enemy gained access at any one point; or if a bomb, grenade, or shell landed in the trench, the blast could not travel far.

Very early in the war, British defensive doctrine suggested a main trench system of three parallel lines, interconnected by communications trenches. The point at which a communications trench intersected the front trench was of critical importance, and it was usually heavily fortified. The front trench was lightly garrisoned and typically occupied in force only during "stand to" at dawn and dusk. Between  behind the front trench was located the support (or "travel") trench, to which the garrison would retreat when the front trench was bombarded.

Between  further to the rear was located the third reserve trench, where the reserve troops could amass for a counter-attack if the front trenches were captured. This defensive layout was soon rendered obsolete as the power of artillery grew; however, in certain sectors of the front, the support trench was maintained as a decoy to attract the enemy bombardment away from the front and reserve lines. Fires were lit in the support line to make it appear inhabited and any damage done immediately repaired.

Temporary trenches were also built. When a major attack was planned, assembly trenches would be dug near the front trench. These were used to provide a sheltered place for the waves of attacking troops who would follow the first waves leaving from the front trench. "Saps" were temporary, unmanned, often dead-end utility trenches dug out into no-man's land. They fulfilled a variety of purposes, such as connecting the front trench to a listening post close to the enemy wire or providing an advance "jumping-off" line for a surprise attack. When one side's front line bulged towards the opposition, a salient was formed. The concave trench line facing the salient was called a "re-entrant." Large salients were perilous for their occupants because they could be assailed from three sides.

Behind the front system of trenches there were usually at least two more partially prepared trench systems, kilometres to the rear, ready to be occupied in the event of a retreat. The Germans often prepared multiple redundant trench systems; in 1916 their Somme front featured two complete trench systems, one kilometre apart, with a third partially completed system a further kilometre behind. This duplication made a decisive breakthrough virtually impossible. In the event that a section of the first trench system was captured, a "switch" trench would be dug to connect the second trench system to the still-held section of the first.

Wire 

Although the barbs or razors might cause minor injuries, the purpose was to entangle the limbs of enemy soldiers, forcing them to stop and methodically pull or work the wire off, likely taking several seconds, or even longer. This is deadly when the wire is emplaced at points of maximum exposure to concentrated enemy firepower, in plain sight of enemy fire bays and machine guns. The combination of wire and firepower was the cause of most failed attacks in trench warfare and their very high casualties. Liddell Hart identified barbed wire and the machine gun as the elements that had to be broken to regain a mobile battlefield.

A basic wire line could be created by draping several strands of barbed wire between wooden posts driven into the ground. Loose lines of wire can be more effective in entangling than tight ones, and it was common to use the coils of barbed wire as delivered only partially stretched out, called concertina wire. Placing and repairing wire in no man's land relied on stealth, usually done at night by special wiring parties, who could also be tasked with secretly sabotaging enemy wires. The screw picket, invented by the Germans and later adopted by the Allies during the war, was quieter than driving stakes. Wire often stretched the entire length of a battlefield's trench line, in multiple lines, sometimes covering a depth  or more.

Methods to defeat it were rudimentary. Prolonged artillery bombardment could damage them, but not reliably. The first soldier meeting the wire could jump onto the top of it, hopefully depressing it enough for those that followed to get over him; this still took at least one soldier out of action for each line of wire. In World War I, British and Commonwealth forces relied on wire cutters, which proved unable to cope with the heavier gauge German wire. The Bangalore torpedo was adopted by many armies, and continued in use past the end of World War II.

The barbed wire used differed between nations; the German wire was heavier gauge, and British wire cutters, designed for the thinner native product, were unable to cut it.

Geography 

The confined, static, and subterranean nature of trench warfare resulted in it developing its own peculiar form of geography. In the forward zone, the conventional transport infrastructure of roads and rail were replaced by the network of trenches and trench railways. The critical advantage that could be gained by holding the high ground meant that minor hills and ridges gained enormous significance. Many slight hills and valleys were so subtle as to have been nameless until the front line encroached upon them. Some hills were named for their height in metres, such as Hill 60. A farmhouse, windmill, quarry, or copse of trees would become the focus of a determined struggle simply because it was the largest identifiable feature. However, it would not take the artillery long to obliterate it, so that thereafter it became just a name on a map.

The battlefield of Flanders presented numerous problems for the practice of trench warfare, especially for the Allied forces, mainly British and Canadians, who were often compelled to occupy the low ground. Heavy shelling quickly destroyed the network of ditches and water channels which had previously drained this low-lying area of Belgium. In most places, the water table was only a metre or so below the surface, meaning that any trench dug in the ground would quickly flood. Consequently, many "trenches" in Flanders were actually above ground and constructed from massive breastworks of sandbags filled with clay. Initially, both the parapet and parados of the trench were built in this way, but a later technique was to dispense with the parados for much of the trench line, thus exposing the rear of the trench to fire from the reserve line in case the front was breached.

The Ortler had an artillery position on its summit near the front line. The trench-line management and trench profiles had to be adapted to the rough terrain, hard rock, and harsh weather conditions. Many trench systems were constructed within glaciers such as the Adamello-Presanella group or the famous city below the ice on the Marmolada in the Dolomites.

Observation 
Observing the enemy in trench warfare was difficult, prompting the invention of technology such as the camouflage tree.

No man's land 

The space between the opposing trenches was referred to as "no man's land" and varied in width depending on the battlefield.

After the German withdrawal to the Hindenburg Line in March 1917, no man's land stretched to over a kilometre in places. On the Eastern Front and in the Middle East, the areas to be covered were so vast, and the distances from the factories supplying shells, bullets, concrete and barbed wire so great, trench warfare in the West European style often did not occur.

Weaponry

Infantry weapons and machine guns 

At the start of the First World War, the standard infantry soldier's primary weapons were the rifle and bayonet; other weapons got less attention. Especially for the British, what hand grenades were issued tended to be few in numbers and less effective. This emphasis began to shift as soon as trench warfare began; militaries rushed improved grenades into mass production, including rifle grenades.

The hand grenade came to be one of the primary infantry weapons of trench warfare. Both sides were quick to raise specialist grenadier groups. The grenade enabled a soldier to engage the enemy without exposing himself to fire, and it did not require precise accuracy to kill or maim. Another benefit was that if a soldier could get close enough to the trenches, enemies hiding in trenches could be attacked. The Germans and Turks were well equipped with grenades from the start of the war, but the British, who had ceased using grenadiers in the 1870s and did not anticipate a siege war, entered the conflict with virtually none, so soldiers had to improvise bombs with whatever was available (see Jam Tin Grenade). By late 1915, the British Mills bomb had entered wide circulation, and by the end of the war 75 million had been used.

Since the troops were often not adequately equipped for trench warfare, improvised weapons were common in the first encounters, such as short wooden clubs and metal maces, spears, hatchets, hammers, entrenching tools, as well as trench knives and brass knuckles. According to the semi-biographical war novel All Quiet on the Western Front, many soldiers preferred to use a sharpened spade as an improvised melee weapon instead of the bayonet, as the bayonet tended to get "stuck" in stabbed opponents, rendering it useless in heated battle. The shorter length also made them easier to use in the confined quarters of the trenches. These tools could then be used to dig in after they had taken a trench. Modern military digging tools are as a rule designed to also function as a melee weapon. As the war progressed, better equipment was issued, and improvised arms were discarded.

A specialised group of fighters called trench sweepers (Nettoyeurs de Tranchées or Zigouilleurs) evolved to fight within the trenches. They cleared surviving enemy personnel from recently overrun trenches and made clandestine raids into enemy trenches to gather intelligence. Volunteers for this dangerous work were often exempted from participation in frontal assaults over open ground and from routine work like filling sandbags, draining trenches, and repairing barbed wire in no-man's land. When allowed to choose their own weapons, many selected grenades, knives and pistols. FN M1900 pistols were highly regarded for this work, but never available in adequate quantities. Colt Model 1903 Pocket Hammerless, Savage Model 1907, Star Bonifacio Echeverria and Ruby pistols were widely used.

Various mechanical devices were invented for throwing hand grenades into enemy trenches. The French responded with the Sauterelle and the British with the Leach Trench Catapult and West Spring Gun which had varying degrees of success and accuracy. By 1916, catapult weapons were largely replaced by rifle grenades and mortars.

The Germans employed Flammenwerfer (flamethrowers) during the war for the first time against the French on 25 June 1915, then against the British 30 July in Hooge. The technology was in its infancy, and use was not very common until the end of 1917 when portability and reliability were improved. It was used in more than 300 documented battles. By 1918, it became a weapon of choice for Stoßtruppen (stormtroopers) with a team of six Pioniere (combat engineers) per squad.

Used by American soldiers in the Western front, the pump action shotgun was a formidable weapon in short range combat, enough so that Germany lodged a formal protest against their use on 14 September 1918, stating "every prisoner found to have in his possession such guns or ammunition belonging thereto forfeits his life", though this threat was apparently never carried out. The U.S. military began to issue models specially modified for combat, called "trench guns", with shorter barrels, higher capacity magazines, no choke, and often heat shields around the barrel, as well as lugs for the M1917 bayonet. Anzac and some British soldiers were also known to use sawn-off shotguns in trench raids, because of their portability, effectiveness at close range, and ease of use in the confines of a trench. This practice was not officially sanctioned, and the shotguns used were invariably modified sporting guns.

The Germans embraced the machine gun from the outset—in 1904, sixteen units were equipped with the 'Maschinengewehr'—and the machine gun crews were the elite infantry units; these units were attached to Jaeger (light infantry) battalions. By 1914, British infantry units were armed with two Vickers machine guns per battalion; the Germans had six per battalion, and the Russians eight. It would not be until 1917 that every infantry unit of the American forces carried at least one machine gun. After 1915, the Maschinengewehr 08 was the standard issue German machine gun; its number "08/15" entered the German language as idiomatic for "dead plain". At Gallipoli and in Palestine the Turks provided the infantry, but it was usually Germans who manned the machine guns.

The British High Command were less enthusiastic about machine guns, supposedly considering the weapon too "unsporting" and encouraging defensive fighting; and they lagged behind the Germans in adopting it. Field Marshal Sir Douglas Haig is quoted as saying in 1915, "The machine gun is a much overrated weapon; two per battalion is more than sufficient". The defensive firepower of the machine gun was exemplified during the first day of the Battle of the Somme when 60,000 British soldiers were rendered casualties, "the great majority lost under withering machine gun fire". In 1915 the Machine Gun Corps was formed to train and provide sufficient heavy machine gun teams.

It was the Canadians that made the best practice, pioneering area denial and indirect fire (soon adopted by all Allied armies) under the guidance of former French Army Reserve officer Major General Raymond Brutinel. Minutes before the attack on Vimy Ridge the Canadians thickened the artillery barrage by aiming machine guns indirectly to deliver plunging fire on the Germans. They also significantly increased the number of machine guns per battalion. To match demand, production of the Vickers machine gun was contracted to firms in the United States. By 1917, every company in the British forces were also equipped with four Lewis light machine guns, which significantly enhanced their firepower.

The heavy machine gun was a specialist weapon, and in a static trench system was employed in a scientific manner, with carefully calculated fields of fire, so that at a moment's notice an accurate burst could be fired at the enemy's parapet or a break in the wire. Equally it could be used as light artillery in bombarding distant trenches. Heavy machine guns required teams of up to eight men to move them, maintain them, and keep them supplied with ammunition. This made them impractical for offensive manoeuvres, contributing to the stalemate on the Western Front.

One machine gun nest was theoretically able to mow down hundreds of enemies charging in the open through no man's land.
However, while WWI machine guns were able to shoot hundreds of rounds per minute in theory, they were still prone to overheating and jamming, which often necessitated firing in short bursts. However, their potential was increased significantly when emplaced behind multiple lines of barbed wire to slow any advancing enemy.

In 1917 and 1918, new types of weapons were fielded. They changed the face of warfare tactics and were later employed during World War II.

The French introduced the CSRG 1915 Chauchat during Spring 1916 around the concept of "walking fire", employed in 1918 when 250,000 weapons were fielded. More than 80,000 of the best shooters received the semi-automatic RSC 1917 rifle, allowing them to rapid fire at waves of attacking soldiers. Firing ports were installed in the newly arrived Renault FT tanks.

The French Army fielded a ground version of the Hotchkiss Canon de 37 mm used by the French Navy. It was primarily used to destroy German machine gun nests and concrete reinforced pillboxes with high explosive and armour-piercing rounds.

A new type of machine gun was introduced in 1916. Initially an aircraft weapon, the Bergmann LMG 15 was modified for ground use, with the later dedicated ground version being the LMG 15 n. A. It was used as an infantry weapon on all European and Middle Eastern fronts until the end of World War I. It later inspired the MG 30 and the MG 34 as well as the concept of the general-purpose machine gun.

What became known as the submachine gun had its genesis in World War I, developed around the concepts of infiltration and fire and movement, specifically to clear trenches of enemy soldiers when engagements were unlikely to occur beyond a range of a few feet. The MP 18 was the first practical submachine gun used in combat. It was fielded in 1918 by the German Army as the primary weapon of the stormtroopers – assault groups that specialised in trench combat. Around the same time, the Italians had developed the Beretta M1918 submachine gun, based on a design from earlier in the war.

Artillery 

Artillery dominated the battlefields of trench warfare. An infantry attack was rarely successful if it advanced beyond the range of its supporting artillery. In addition to bombarding the enemy infantry in the trenches, the artillery could be used to precede infantry advances with a creeping barrage, or engage in counter-battery duels to try to destroy the enemy's guns. Artillery mainly fired fragmentation, high-explosive, shrapnel or, later in the war, gas shells. The British experimented with firing thermite incendiary shells, to set trees and ruins alight. However, all armies experienced shell shortages during the first year or two of World War I, due to underestimating their usage in intensive combat. This knowledge had been gained by the combatant nations in the Russo-Japanese War, when daily artillery fire consumed ten times more than daily factory output, but had not been applied.

Artillery pieces were of two types: infantry support guns and howitzers. Guns fired high-velocity shells over a flat trajectory and were often used to deliver fragmentation and to cut barbed wire. Howitzers lofted the shell over a high trajectory so it plunged into the ground. The largest calibers were usually howitzers. A critical feature of period artillery pieces was the hydraulic recoil mechanism, which meant the gun did not need to be re-aimed after each shot, permitting a tremendous increase in rate of fire.

Initially each gun would need to register its aim on a known target, in view of an observer, in order to fire with precision during a battle. The process of gun registration would often alert the enemy an attack was being planned. Towards the end of 1917, artillery techniques were developed enabling fire to be delivered accurately without registration on the battlefield—the gun registration was done behind the lines then the pre-registered guns were brought up to the front for a surprise attack.

Mortars, which lobbed a shell in a high arc over a relatively short distance, were widely used in trench fighting for harassing the forward trenches, for cutting wire in preparation for a raid or attack, and for destroying dugouts, saps and other entrenchments. In 1914, the British fired a total of 545 mortar shells; in 1916, they fired over 6,500,000. Similarly, howitzers, which fire on a more direct arc than mortars, raised in number from over 1,000 shells in 1914, to over 4,500,000 in 1916. The smaller numerical difference in mortar rounds, as opposed to howitzer rounds, is presumed by many to be related to the expanded costs of manufacturing the larger and more resource intensive howitzer rounds.

The main British mortar was the Stokes, a precursor of the modern mortar. It was a light mortar, simple in operation, and capable of a rapid rate of fire by virtue of the propellant cartridge being attached to the base shell. To fire the Stokes mortar, the round was simply dropped into the tube, where the percussion cartridge was detonated when it struck the firing pin at the bottom of the barrel, thus being launched. The Germans used a range of mortars. The smallest were grenade-throwers ('Granatenwerfer') which fired the stick grenades which were commonly used. Their medium trench-mortars were called mine-throwers ('Minenwerfer'). The flight of the missile was so slow and leisurely that men on the receiving end could make some attempt to seek shelter.

Mortars had certain advantages over artillery such as being much more portable and the ability to fire without leaving the relative safety of trenches. Moreover, mortars were able to fire directly into the trenches, which was hard to do with artillery.

Strategy and tactics 

The fundamental strategy of trench warfare in World War I was to defend one's own position strongly while trying to achieve a breakthrough into the enemy's rear. The effect was to end up in attrition; the process of progressively grinding down the opposition's resources until, ultimately, they are no longer able to wage war. This did not prevent the ambitious commander from pursuing the strategy of annihilation—the ideal of an offensive battle which produces victory in one decisive engagement.

The Commander in Chief of the British forces during most of World War I, General Douglas Haig, was constantly seeking a "breakthrough" which could then be exploited with cavalry divisions. His major trench offensives—the Somme in 1916 and Flanders in 1917—were conceived as breakthrough battles but both degenerated into costly attrition. The Germans actively pursued a strategy of attrition in the Battle of Verdun, the sole purpose of which was to "bleed the French Army white". At the same time the Allies needed to mount offensives in order to draw attention away from other hard-pressed areas of the line.

The popular image of a trench assault is of a wave of soldiers, bayonets fixed, going "over the top" and marching in a line across no man's land into a hail of enemy fire. This was the standard method early in the war; it was rarely successful.  More common was an attack at night from an advanced post in no man's land, having cut the barbed wire beforehand. In 1915, the Germans innovated with infiltration tactics where small groups of highly trained and well-equipped troops would attack vulnerable points and bypass strong points, driving deep into the rear areas. The distance they could advance was still limited by their ability to supply and communicate.

The role of artillery in an infantry attack was twofold. The first aim of a bombardment was to prepare the ground for an infantry assault, killing or demoralising the enemy garrison and destroying their defences. The duration of these initial bombardments varied, from seconds to days. Artillery bombardments prior to infantry assaults were often ineffective at destroying enemy defences, only serving to provide advance notice of an attack. The British bombardment that began the Battle of the Somme lasted eight days but did little damage to either the German barbed wire or their deep dug-outs, where defenders were able to wait out the bombardment in relative safety.

Once the guns stopped, the defenders had time to emerge and were usually ready for the attacking infantry. The second aim was to protect the attacking infantry by providing an impenetrable "barrage" or curtain of shells to prevent an enemy counter-attack. The first attempt at sophistication was the "lifting barrage" where the first objective of an attack was intensely bombarded for a period before the entire barrage "lifted" to fall on a second objective farther back. However, this usually expected too much of the infantry, and the usual outcome was that the barrage would outpace the attackers, leaving them without protection.

This resulted in the use of the "creeping barrage" which would lift more frequently but in smaller steps, sweeping the ground ahead and moving so slowly that the attackers could usually follow closely behind it. This became the standard method of attack from late 1916 onward. The main benefit of the barrage was suppression of the enemy rather than to cause casualties or material damage.

Capturing the objective was half the battle, but the battle was won only if the objective was held. The attacking force would have to advance with not only the weapons required to capture a trench but also the tools—sandbags, picks and shovels, barbed wire—to fortify and defend from counter-attack. A successful advance would take the attackers beyond the range of their own field artillery, making them vulnerable, and it took time to move guns up over broken ground. The Germans placed great emphasis on immediately counter-attacking to regain lost ground. This strategy cost them dearly in 1917 when the British started to limit their advances so as to be able to meet the anticipated counter-attack from a position of strength. Part of the British artillery was positioned close behind the original start line and took no part in the initial bombardment, so as to be ready to support later phases of the operation while other guns were moved up.

The Germans were the first to apply the concept of "defence in depth", where the front-line zone was hundreds of metres deep and contained a series of redoubts rather than a continuous trench. Each redoubt could provide supporting fire to its neighbours, and while the attackers had freedom of movement between the redoubts, they would be subjected to withering enfilade fire. They were also more willing than their opponents to make a strategic withdrawal to a superior prepared defensive position. The British eventually adopted a similar approach, but it was incompletely implemented when the Germans launched the 1918 Spring Offensive and proved disastrously ineffective. France, by contrast, relied on artillery and reserves, not entrenchment.

Life in the trenches 

An individual unit's time in a front-line trench was usually brief; from as little as one day to as much as two weeks at a time before being relieved. The 31st Australian Battalion once spent 53 days in the line at Villers-Bretonneux, but such a duration was a rare exception. The 10th Battalion, CEF, averaged frontline tours of six days in 1915 and 1916.
The units who manned the frontline trenches the longest were the Portuguese Expeditionary Corps from Portugal stationed in Northern France; unlike the other allies the Portuguese couldn't rotate units from the front lines due to lack of reinforcements sent from Portugal, nor could they replace the depleted units that lost manpower due to the war of attrition. With this rate of casualties and no reinforcements forthcoming, most of the men were denied leave and had to serve long periods in the trenches with some units spending up to six consecutive months in the front line with little to no leave during that time.

On an individual level, a typical British soldier's year could be divided as follows:

15% front line
10% support line
30% reserve line
20% rest
25% other (hospital, travelling, leave, training courses, etc.)

Even when in the front line, the typical battalion would be called upon to engage in fighting only a handful of times a year; making an attack, defending against an attack or participating in a raid. The frequency of combat would increase for the units of the "elite" fighting divisions; on the Allied side, these were the British regular divisions, the Canadian Corps, the French XX Corps, and the Anzacs.

Some sectors of the front saw little activity throughout the war, making life in the trenches comparatively easy. When the I Anzac Corps first arrived in France in April 1916 after the evacuation of Gallipoli, they were sent to a relatively peaceful sector south of Armentières to "acclimatise". In contrast, some other sectors were in a perpetual state of violent activity. On the Western Front, Ypres was invariably hellish, especially for the British in the exposed, overlooked salient. However, even quiet sectors amassed daily casualties through sniper fire, artillery, disease, and poison gas. In the first six months of 1916, before the launch of the Somme Offensive, the British did not engage in any significant battles on their sector of the Western Front and yet suffered 107,776 casualties.

A sector of the front would be allocated to an army corps, usually comprising three divisions. Two divisions would occupy adjacent sections of the front, and the third would be in rest to the rear. This breakdown of duty would continue down through the army structure, so that within each front-line division, typically comprising three infantry brigades (regiments for the Germans), two brigades would occupy the front and the third would be in reserve. Within each front-line brigade, typically comprising four battalions, two battalions would occupy the front with two in reserve, and so on for companies and platoons. The lower down the structure this division of duty proceeded, the more frequently the units would rotate from front-line duty to support or reserve.

During the day, snipers and artillery observers in balloons made movement perilous, so the trenches were mostly quiet. It was during these daytime hours that the soldiers would amuse themselves with trench magazines. Because of the peril associated with daytime activities, trenches were busiest at night when the cover of darkness allowed movement of troops and supplies, the maintenance and expansion of the barbed wire and trench system, and reconnaissance of the enemy's defenses. Sentries in listening posts out in no man's land would try to detect enemy patrols and working parties, or indications that an attack was being prepared.

Pioneered by the Princess Patricia's Canadian Light Infantry in February 1915, trench raids were carried out in order to capture prisoners and "booty"—letters and other documents to provide intelligence about the unit occupying the opposing trenches. As the war progressed, raiding became part of the general British policy, the intention being to maintain the fighting spirit of the troops and to deny no man's land to the Germans. As well, they were intended to compel the enemy to reinforce, which exposed their troops to artillery fire.

Such dominance was achieved at a high cost when the enemy replied with their own artillery, and a post-war British analysis concluded the benefits were probably not worth the cost. Early in the war, surprise raids would be mounted, particularly by the Canadians, but increased vigilance made achieving surprise difficult as the war progressed. By 1916, raids were carefully planned exercises in combined arms and involved close co-operation between infantry and artillery.

A raid would begin with an intense artillery bombardment designed to drive off or kill the front-trench garrison and cut the barbed wire. Then the bombardment would shift to form a "box barrage", or cordon, around a section of the front line to prevent a counter-attack intercepting the raid. However, the bombardment also had the effect of notifying the enemy of the location of the planned attack, thus allowing reinforcements to be called in from wider sectors.

Dangers 

Approximately 10–15 percent of all soldiers who fought in the First World War died as a result.

While the main cause of death in the trenches came from shelling and gunfire, diseases and infections were always present, and became prevalent for all sides as the war progressed. Medical procedures, while considerably more effective than at any previous time in history, were still not very helpful; antibiotics had not yet been discovered or invented. As a result, an infection caught in a trench often went untreated and could fester until the soldier died.

Injuries 

The main killer in the trenches was artillery fire; around 75 percent of known casualties. Even if a soldier was not hit directly by the artillery, shell fragments and debris had a high chance of wounding those in close proximity to the blast. Artillery use increased tremendously during the war; for example, the percentage of the French army that was  artillerymen grew from 20 percent in 1914 to 38 percent by 1918. The second largest contributor to death was gunfire (bullets from rifles and machine-guns), which was responsible for 34 percent of French military casualties.

Once the war entered the static phase of trench warfare, the number of lethal head wounds that troops were receiving from fragmentation increased dramatically. The French were the first to see a need for greater protection and began to introduce steel helmets in the summer of 1915. The Adrian helmet replaced the traditional French kepi and was later adopted by the Belgian, Italian and many other armies. At about the same time the British were developing their own helmets. The French design was rejected as not strong enough and too difficult to mass-produce. The design that was eventually approved by the British was the Brodie helmet. This had a wide brim to protect the wearer from falling objects, but offered less protection to the wearer's neck. When the Americans entered the war, this was the helmet they chose, though some units used the French Adrian helmet.

Disease 

The predominant disease in the trenches of the Western Front was trench fever. Trench fever was a common disease spread through the faeces of body lice, which were rampant in trenches. Trench fever caused headaches, shin pain, splenomegaly, rashes and relapsing fevers – resulting in lethargy for months. First reported on the Western Front in 1915 by a British medical officer, additional cases of trench fever became increasingly common mostly in the frontline troops. In 1921, microbiologist Sir David Bruce reported that over one million Allied soldiers were infected by trench fever throughout the war. Even after the Great War had ended, disabled veterans in Britain attributed their decreasing quality of life to trench fever they had sustained during wartime.

Early in the war, gas gangrene commonly developed in major wounds, in part because the Clostridium bacteria responsible are ubiquitous in manure-fertilized soil (common in western European agriculture, such as France and Belgium), and dirt would often get into a wound (or be rammed in by shrapnel, explosion, or bullet).  In 1914, 12% of wounded British soldiers developed gas gangrene, and at least 100,000 German soldiers died directly from the infection. After rapid advances in medical procedures and practices, the incidence of gas gangrene fell to 1% by 1918.

Entrenched soldiers also carried many intestinal parasites, such as ascariasis, trichuriasis and tapeworm. These parasites were common amongst soldiers, and spread amongst them, due to the unhygienic environment created by the common trench, where there were no true sewage management procedures. This ensured that parasites (and diseases) would spread onto rations and food sources that would then be eaten by other soldiers.

Trench foot was a common environmental ailment affecting many soldiers, especially during the winter. It is one of several immersion foot syndromes. It was characterized by numbness and pain in the feet, but in bad cases could result in necrosis of the lower limbs. Trench foot was a large problem for the Allied forces, resulting in 2000 American and 75,000 British casualties. Mandatory routine (daily or more often) foot inspections by fellow soldiers, along with systematic use of soap, foot powder, and changing socks, greatly reduced cases of trench foot. In 1918, US infantry were issued with an improved and more waterproof 'Pershing boot' in an attempt to reduce casualties from trench foot.

To the surprise of medical professionals at the time, there was no outbreak of typhus in the trenches of the Western Front, despite the cold and harsh conditions being perfect for the reproduction of body lice that transmit the disease.  However, on the Eastern Front an epidemic of typhus claimed between 150,000 – 200,000 lives in Serbia. Russia also suffered a globally unprecedented typhus epidemic during the last two years of the conflict that was exacerbated by harsh winters. This outbreak resulted in approximately 2.5 million recorded deaths, 100,000 of them being Red Army soldiers.  Symptoms of typhus include a characteristic spotted rash (which was not always present), severe headache, sustained high fever of 39 °C (102 °F), cough, severe muscle pain, chills, falling blood pressure, stupor, sensitivity to light, and delirium; 10% to 60% die. Typhus is spread by body lice.

Trench rats 

Millions of rats called the trenches home, and these rats were often responsible for the spread of diseases. Soldiers' attempts to cull hordes of trench rats with rifle bayonets were common early in the war, but the rats reproduced faster than they could be slaughtered. However, soldiers still partook in rat hunts as a form of entertainment. Rats would feed on half-eaten or uneaten rations as well as corpses. Many soldiers were more afraid of rats than other horrors found in the trenches.

Psychological impact 

Nervous and mental breakdowns amongst soldiers were common, due to unrelenting shellfire and the claustrophobic trench environment. Men who suffered such intense breakdowns were often rendered completely immobile, and were often seen cowering low in the trenches, unable even to perform instinctive human responses such as running away or fighting back. This condition came to be known as "shell shock", "war neurosis" or "battle hypnosis". Although trenches provided cover from shelling and small-arms fire, they also amplified the psychological effects of shell shock, as there was no way to escape a trench if shellfire was coming. If a soldier became too debilitated from shell shock, they were evacuated from the trench and hospitalized if possible. In some cases, shell shocked soldiers were executed for "cowardice" by their commanders as they became a liability. This was often done by a firing squad composed of their fellow soldiers – often from the same unit. Only years later would it be understood that such men were suffering from shell shock. During the war, 306 British soldiers were officially executed by their own side.

Circumvention 

Throughout World War I, the major combatants slowly developed different ways of breaking the stalemate of trench warfare; the Germans focused more on new tactics while the British and French focused on tanks.

Infiltration tactics 

As far back as the 18th century, Prussian military doctrine (Vernichtungsgedanke) stressed maneuver and force concentration to achieve a decisive battle. The German military searched for ways to apply this in the face of trench warfare. Experiments with new tactics by Willy Rohr, a Prussian captain serving in the Vosges mountains in 1915, got the attention of the Minister of War. These tactics carried Prussian military doctrine down to smallest units — specially trained troops maneuvered and massed to assault positions they chose on their own. During the next two years the German army tried to establish special stormtrooper detachments in all its units by sending selected men to Rohr and have those men then train their comrades in their original units.

Similar tactics were developed independently in other countries, such as French Army captain  in 1915 and Russian general Aleksei Brusilov in 1916, but these failed to be adopted as any military doctrine.

The German stormtrooper methods involved men rushing forward in small groups using whatever cover was available and laying down covering fire for other groups in the same unit as they moved forward. The new tactics, intended to achieve surprise by disrupting entrenched enemy positions, aimed to bypass strongpoints and to attack the weakest parts of an enemy's line. Additionally, they acknowledged the futility of managing a grand detailed plan of operations from afar, opting instead for junior officers on the spot to exercise initiative.

The Germans employed and improved infiltration tactics in a series of smaller to larger battles, each increasingly successful, leading up to the Battle of Caporetto against the Italians in 1917, and finally the massive German spring offensive in 1918 against the British and French. German infiltration tactics are sometimes called "Hutier tactics" by others, after Oskar von Hutier, the general leading the German 18th Army, which had the farthest advance in that offensive. After a stunningly rapid advance, the offensive failed to achieve a breakthrough; German forces stalled after outrunning their supply, artillery, and reinforcements, which could not catch up over the shell-torn ground left ruined by Allied attacks in the Battle of the Somme in 1916. The exhausted German forces were soon pushed back in the Allied Hundred Days Offensive, and the Germans were unable to organise another major offensive before the war's end. In post-war years, other nations did not fully appreciate these German tactical innovations amidst the overall German defeat.

Mining 

Mines – tunnels under enemy lines packed with explosives and detonated – were widely used in WWI to destroy or disrupt enemy's trench lines. Mining and counter-mining became a major part of trench warfare.

The dry chalk of the Somme was especially suited to mining, but with the aid of pumps, it was also possible to mine in the sodden clay of Flanders. Specialist tunneling companies, usually made up of men who had been miners in civilian life, would dig tunnels under no man's land and beneath the enemy's trenches. These mines would then be packed with explosives and detonated, producing a large crater. The crater served two purposes: it could destroy or breach the enemy's trench and, by virtue of the raised lip that they produced, could provide a ready-made "trench" closer to the enemy's line. When a mine was detonated, both sides would race to occupy and fortify the crater.

If the miners detected an enemy tunnel in progress, they would often counter-mine and try to drive a tunnel under the enemy's tunnel in which they would detonate explosives to create a camouflet to destroy the enemy's tunnel. Night raids were also conducted with the sole purpose of destroying the enemy's mine workings. On occasion, mines would cross and fighting would occur underground. The mining skills could also be used to move troops unseen. On one occasion a whole British division was moved through interconnected workings and sewers without German observation. The British detonated 19 mines of varying sizes on July 1, 1916, the first day of the Battle of the Somme. The largest mines—the Y Sap Mine and the Lochnagar Mine—each containing 24 tons of explosives, were blown near La Boiselle, throwing earth  into the air.

At 3.10 AM on June 7, 1917, a series of mines was detonated by the British to launch the Battle of Messines. The average mine contained 21 tons of explosive and the largest,  beneath Saint-Eloi, was twice the average at 42 tons. As remarked by General Plumer to his staff the evening before the attack:

"Gentlemen, we may not make history tomorrow, but we shall certainly change the geography."

The craters from these and many other mines on the Western Front are still visible today. Two undetonated mines remained in the ground near Messines, with their location mislaid after the war. One blew during a thunderstorm in 1955; the other remains in the ground. Significant mining operations were also carried out on the Italian Front.

Gas 

World War I saw large-scale use of poison gases. At the start of the war, the gas agents used were relatively weak and delivery unreliable, but by mid-war advances in this chemical warfare reached horrifying levels.

The first methods of employing gas was by releasing it from a cylinder when the wind was favourable. This was prone to miscarry if the direction of the wind was misjudged. Also, the cylinders needed to be positioned in the front trenches where they were likely to be ruptured by enemy bombardment. Later, gas was delivered directly to enemy trenches by artillery or mortar shell, reducing friendly casualties significantly. Lingering agents could still affect friendly troops that advanced to enemy trenches following its use.

Early on, soldiers made improvised gas masks by urinating on a handkerchief and putting it over their nose and mouth so the urea would disable the poison. Armies rushed to issue regulation gas masks as regular equipment for front \line troops. Anti-gas equipment and procedures improved significantly during the war, to the point that gas attacks had become less devastating at the war's end.

Several different gas agents were used. Tear gas was first employed in August 1914 by the French, but this could only temporarily disable the enemy. In April 1915, chlorine gas was first used by Germany at the Second Battle of Ypres. Exposure to a large dose could kill, and those not killed could suffer permanent lung damage. But the gas was easy to detect by scent and sight. Phosgene, first used in December 1915, was the most lethal killing gas of World War I; it was 18 times more powerful than chlorine and much more difficult to detect.

However, the most effective gas was mustard gas, introduced by Germany in July 1917. Mustard gas was not as fatal as phosgene, but it was hard to detect and lingered on the surface of the battlefield, so could inflict casualties over a long period. Even if not inhaled, it could slowly burn the skin, but quickly burned via the eyes or any wounds, causing blindness and intense suffering. Mustard gas also had the property of being heavier than air, causing it to sink down hills and therefore down into trenches. Casualties from mustard gas were unlikely to be fit to fight again, yet only 2% of mustard gas casualties died. The added burden of long term care of casualties from mustard gas actually increased its overall effectiveness compared to more immediately lethal gas agents.

Tanks

Tanks were developed by the British and French as a means to attack enemy trenches, by combining heavy firepower (machine guns or light artillery guns), protection from small-arms fire (armour), and battlefield mobility (tracks). The British tanks were designed with a rhomboid shape, to easily surmount barbed wire and other obstacles. They were first deployed in 1916 at the Battle of the Somme in limited numbers, proving unreliable and ineffective at first, as mechanical and logistical issues overshadowed implementing a coherent tank doctrine, with the additional challenge of traversing ground torn apart by years of shell fire. At the First Battle of Cambrai in 1917, improved tanks in larger numbers demonstrated the potential of tank warfare, though German improvised anti-tank tactics, including using direct fire from field artillery, also proved effective.

By 1918, tank capabilities and tactics improved, their numbers increased and, combined with French tanks, finally helped break the stalemate. During the last 100 days of the war, Allied forces harried the Germans back using infantry supported by tanks and by close air support. By the war's end, tanks become a significant element of warfare; the proposed British Plan 1919 would have employed tanks as a primary factor in military strategy. However, the impact of tanks in World War I was less than it could have been, due to their late introduction and the inherent issues that plague implementing revolutionary technology.

Between the two world wars many nations developed their own unique tanks and divergent theories of tank tactics, including the UK, France, the Soviet Union, Czechoslovakia, Japan, the US, and Italy. Though German tank development was restricted by the terms of the treaty ending World War I, Germany successfully combined their own tanks (plus Czech tanks from occupied Czechoslovakia) with infiltration tactics to produce blitzkrieg during World War II.

Later use

Spanish Civil War 
Trenches were often used in both sides particularly the Nationalists whose military ground doctrine employs static defense. The Republicans also employ the use of trenches, but also human wave attacks most notably during their defense of Casa de Campo in the Siege of Madrid.

World War II 
In the decade leading up to World War II, the French built the Maginot Line, based on their experience with trench warfare in World War I. The Maginot Line was an extensive state-of-the-art defensive system far superior to any previous trench system: a chain of massive constructions of concrete, iron, and steel fortresses, bunkers, retractable turrets, outposts, obstacles, and sunken artillery emplacements, linked by tunnel networks. It was supported by numerous underground barracks, shelters, ammunition dumps and depots, with its own telephone network and narrow gauge railways with armoured locomotives, backed up with heavy rail artillery. French military experts placed high value on the line, saying it would curb German aggression, as any invasion force would be halted long enough for French forces to mobilize and counterattack. Furthermore, French military planning during the inter-war period believed that the line would force the Germans to invade Belgium. This would allow any future conflict to take place off of French soil. By bypassing the Maginot Line and fighting the Belgian Army, it would allow the French military to move its best formations to counter. In the Battle of France, Germany invaded Belgium and the best Anglo-French forces moved to meet them as planned. However, the Germans had only recently changed their plans from what the French had anticipated would happen. Instead of an attack through central Belgium, the main German attack was delivered through the Ardennes forest. Inter-war French planning believed it would take the Germans 9 days to move forces through this area, and that it could be held by small forces. The German forces outpaced expectations and soon crossed into France between the main French forces and the Maginot Line. They then advanced towards the English Channel, and surrounded the Anglo-French armies. Small secondary German attacks concentrated at a few points in the Line had mixed success. The bulk of the Maginot Line was untouched, its garrisons withdrawn, and flanked. Due to the lack of combat, much of it has survived.

The return of mobile warfare in World War II reduced the emphasis of trench warfare, as defenders commonly lacked the time to build up such battlefield defenses before they were forced to redeploy, due to the more rapidly-changing strategic situation. But trench systems were still effective, wherever mobility was limited, the front lines were static, or around known critical objectives that could not be bypassed. More quickly improvised defensive fighting positions, using "scrapes" or "foxholes", that can be supplemented by sand bags, local materials, debris, or rubble, remain in common use. These are typically improved and expanded by the defenders, eventually becoming full trench systems, if given enough time and resources.

In the Winter War, the Mannerheim Line was a system of flexible field fortification for the defending Finns. While having very few bunkers and artillery compared to heavy defense lines like the Maginot Line, it allowed defensive platoons to regroup between field fortifications (wood-earth firing posts, dugouts and pillboxes) instead of locking them into bunkers, while forcing the invaders to attack trenches as in World War I without armor and direct fire support. It caused heavy losses to the Soviets and repelled them for two months.

At the Battle of Sevastopol, Red Army forces successfully held trench systems on the narrow peninsula for several months against intense German bombardment. The Western Allies in 1944 broke through the incomplete Atlantic Wall with relative ease through a combination of amphibious landings, naval gunfire, air attack, and airborne landings. Combined arms tactics where infantry, artillery, armour and aircraft cooperate closely greatly reduced the importance of trench warfare. It was, however, still a valuable method for reinforcing natural boundaries and creating a line of defence. For example, at the Battle of Stalingrad, soldiers on both sides dug trenches within the ruins; as well in the Battle of Hurtgen Forest, both American and German soldiers also dug trenches and fox holes in the rugged woods of the forest which led to continuous stalemates and failed offensives that lasted for months, which was reminiscent of the trench warfare of World War I. In addition, before the start of the Battle of Kursk, the Soviets constructed a system of defence more elaborate than any they built during World War I. These defences succeeded in stopping the German armoured pincers from meeting and enveloping the salient.

The Italian Campaign fought from 1943 until the end of the war in Europe largely consisted of the Allies storming strongly fortified German lines which stretched from one coast, over the mountains to the other coast. When the Allies broke through one line, the Germans would retreat up the peninsula to yet another freshly prepared fortified line.
 
Entrenchment allowed the Germans, who were massively outnumbered, to survive a bombardment from the largest concentration of artillery in history; as the Red Army attempted to cross the marshy riverside terrain they lost tens of thousands of casualties to the entrenched Germans before breaking through.

During the Pacific War, the Japanese used a labyrinth of underground fixed positions to slow down the Allied advances on many Pacific Islands. The Japanese built fixed fortifications on Iwo Jima, Okinawa, and Peleliu using a system of tunnels to interconnect their fortified positions. Many of these were former mine shafts that were turned into defense positions. Engineers added sliding armored steel doors with multiple openings to serve both artillery and machine guns. Cave entrances were built slanted as a defense against grenade and flamethrower attacks. The caves and bunkers were connected to a vast system throughout the defenses, which allowed the Japanese to evacuate or reoccupy positions as needed, and to take advantage of shrinking interior lines. This network of bunkers, tunnels, and pillboxes favored the defense. For instance, the Japanese on Iwo Jima had several levels of honeycombed fortifications. The Nanpo Bunker (Southern Area Islands Naval Air HQ), which was located east of Airfield Number 2, had enough food, water and ammo for the Japanese to hold out for three months. The bunker was 90 feet deep and had tunnels running in various directions. Approximately 500 55-gallon drums filled with water, kerosene, and fuel oil for generators were located inside the complex. Gasoline powered generators allowed for radios and lighting to be operated underground. The Japanese caused the American advance to slow down and caused massive casualties with these underground fixed positions. The Americans eventually used flamethrowers and systematic hand-to-hand fighting to oust the defenders. The American ground forces were supported by extensive naval artillery, and had complete air supremacy provided by U.S. Navy and Marine Corps aviators throughout the entire battle.

Post-1945 to modern day 

Trench warfare has been infrequent in recent wars. When two large armoured armies meet, the result has generally been mobile warfare of the type which developed in World War II. However, trench warfare re-emerged in the latter stages of the Chinese Civil War (Huaihai Campaign) and the Korean War (from July 1951 to its end).

During the Cold War, NATO forces routinely trained to fight through extensive works called "Soviet-style trench systems", named after the Warsaw Pact's complex systems of field fortifications, an extension of Soviet field entrenching practices for which they were famous in their Great Patriotic War (the Eastern Front of World War II).

In the Iran–Iraq War, both armies lacked training in combined arms operations. Both countries often prepared entrenched defensive positions and tunnels to protect and supply the cities and bases throughout the regions. Military mobility was drastically reduced; hidden land mines, and unstable footing made it easy to slide into or get buried in a camouflaged anti-tank trench. Tactics used included trench warfare, machine gun posts, bayonet charges, booby traps, use of barbed wire across trenches and on no-man's land, Iranian human wave attacks, and Iraq's extensive use of chemical weapons such as mustard gas against Iranian troops.

Iraq again attempted to use again trenches during the 1991 Gulf War. After the Invasion of Kuwait, Saddam Hussein with the objective of forcing the coalition to engange in costly World War I-era trench warfare, ordered the construction of a massive fortification line in the Saudi-Kuwait border, consisting of regular trenchlines, "flame trenches" (ditches filled with oil to be ignited in case of attack), sand berms, trench works, tank ditches, barbed wire and minefields, which became known as the Saddam Line. However, at the start of the Liberation of Kuwait, the US forces charged the Iraqi lines with M1 Abrams tanks modified with minesweeping plows and M728 Combat Engineer Vehicles which buried the trenchlines, and in many cases, buried Iraqi troops alive, the number of which has been estimated to be "in the thousands". In less than three hours after the initial assault, US and coalition forces had already broken through and bypassed the Saddam line and the rest of war was composed by highly mobile maneuver warfare focusing on overwhelming power against the Iraqis.

There was an extensive trench system inside and outside the city during the 1992–1996 Siege of Sarajevo. It was used mainly for transportation to the front-line or to avoid snipers inside the city. Any pre-existing structures were used as trenches; the best known example is the bobsleigh course at Trebević, which was used by both Serb and Bosniak forces during the siege.

In the Eritrean-Ethiopian War of 1998–2000, the widespread use of trenches raised comparisons to the trench warfare of World War I. According to some reports, trench warfare led to the loss of "thousands of young lives in human-wave assaults on Eritrea's positions". The Eritrean defences were eventually overtaken by a surprise Ethiopian pincer movement on the Western front, attacking a mined, but lightly defended mountain (without trenches), resulting in the capture of Barentu and an Eritrean retreat. The element of surprise in the attack involved the use of donkeys as pack animals as well as being a solely infantry affair, with tanks coming in afterwards only to secure the area.

The front line in Korea and the Kashmir conflict between Pakistan and India are two examples of demarcation lines which could become hot at any time. They consist of kilometres of trenches linking fortified strongpoints and in Korea surrounded by millions of land mines. The borders between Armenia and Azerbaijan amid the ongoing Nagorno-Karabakh conflict are also heavily fortified with trenches and barbed wire, with the two sides regularly trading fire.

Russo-Ukrainian War 

In the war in Donbas (2014–2022), to consolidate and defend their territory, Ukrainian and Russian proxy forces dug trenches and initiated warfare reminiscent of World War I, with troops staying in and fighting from trenches for months at a time using cement mixers and excavators at their lines for digging network tunnels and deep bunkers for protection. After the Minsk peace agreements the front lines did not move significantly until the 2022 Russian invasion of Ukraine, as both sides dug elaborate networks of trenches and deep bunkers for protection and the two sides mostly fired mortars and sniper shots at each other.

The 2022 invasion also saw the construction of major trenchlines and similar defensive structures by both sides, especially after the end of the initial Russian offensive, resulting in a static war of attrition with slow advances and artillery duels, especially in Donetsk Oblast. Pictures of muddy trenches, stumps of churned trees in a shell-pocked landscape made the Battle of Bakhmut emblematic for its trench warfare conditions, with neither side making any significant breakthroughs amid hundreds of casualties reported daily.

Cultural impact 

Trench warfare has become a powerful symbol of the futility of war. Its image is of young men going "over the top" (over the parapet of the trench, to attack the enemy trench line) into a maelstrom of fire leading to near-certain death, typified by the first day of the Battle of the Somme (on which the British Army suffered nearly 60,000 casualties) or the grinding slaughter in the mud of Passchendaele. To the French, the equivalent is the attrition of the Battle of Verdun in which the French Army suffered 380,000 casualties.

Trench warfare is associated with mass slaughter in appalling conditions. Many critics have argued that brave men went to their deaths because of incompetent and narrow-minded commanders who failed to adapt to the new conditions of trench warfare: class-ridden and backward-looking generals put their faith in the attack, believing superior morale and dash would overcome the weapons and moral inferiority of the defender. British public opinion often repeated the theme that their soldiers were  "lions led by donkeys".

World War I generals are often portrayed as callously persisting in repeated hopeless attacks against trenches. There were failures such as Passchendaele, and Sir Douglas Haig has often been criticised for allowing his battles to continue long after they had lost any purpose other than attrition. Haig's defenders counter that the attrition was necessary in order to cause attrition in the German army.

The problems of trench warfare were recognised, and attempts were made to address them. These included improvements in artillery, infantry tactics, and the development of tanks. By 1918, taking advantage of failing German morale, Allied attacks were generally more successful and suffered fewer casualties; in the Hundred Days Offensive, there was a return to mobile warfare.

See also 

 Harry Patch
 Mercy dog
 Sangar (fortification)
 Underground living

References 
Notes

Bibliography

 
 
 
 
 
 
 
 
 
 
 Murray, Nicholas. The Rocky Road to the Great War: The Evolution of Trench Warfare to 1914. Potomac Books Inc. (an imprint of the University of Nebraska Press), 2013.

External links 

 Johnson, Patrick In Depth: A century of mud and fire, BBC News, 27 June 2006
 Historic films and photos showing "Trench Warfare in World War I" at europeanfilmgateway.eu
 World War I Tanks at Tanks Encyclopedia
 YouTube video of excavated and restored British WWI trench near Ypres
 Preserved Trenches Sanctuary Wood, Ypres, Belgium
 Trench Warfare | Apocalypse World War
 Trench warfare: Britannica.com article
 YouTube video of Hill 60 on the Messines Ridge, site of a huge underground explosion
 William Philpott: Warfare 1914–1918, in: 1914-1918-online. International Encyclopedia of the First World War.
 Jeffrey LaMonica: Infantry, in: 1914-1918-online. International Encyclopedia of the First World War.
 Stéphane Audoin-Rouzeau: Weapons, in: 1914-1918-online. International Encyclopedia of the First World War.
 Markus Pöhlmann: Close Combat Weapons, in: 1914-1918-online. International Encyclopedia of the First World War.
 Nathan Watanabe: Hand Grenade, in: 1914-1918-online. International Encyclopedia of the First World War.

 
Military doctrines
Military strategy
Subterranea (geography)
Warfare by type